The 104th Independent Brigade of the Territorial Defense Forces is a military formation of the Territorial Defense Forces of Ukraine in Rivne Oblast. It is part of Operational Command West.

History

Formation 
In 2018, governor of Rivne Oblast Oleksiy Mulyarenko and commander of Operational Command West Major General Oleksandr Pavlyuk were tasked with control of creation of battalion. Tsys Oleksandr became first commander of the Brigade. He announced that brigade will have about 3500 troops, mostly reservists, who will have yearly training exercises.

In November 2018, between 200 and 300 reservists from Varash and 9 neighboring raions, gathered at a shooting range. Also they conducted tactical, medical and engineering exercises. In December, Brigade along with neighboring brigades, held joint combat readiness exercises conducted by join Ukrainian and British instructors.

Between 17-23 May 2019, Brigade held staff officer exercises. They included planning combat and special operations, marches, supply issues.

On 8 October 2019, 61st Territorial Defense Battalion held combat readiness exercise for more than 200 soldiers.

From 22 to 30 September 2021, strategic command and staff exercises Joint Efforts-2021 were held in Ukraine. Brigade took part in it along with about 12,500 troops and troops from 15 countries, including 11 NATO member countries.

Russo-Ukrainian War

2022 Russian invasion of Ukraine
2 days after invasion, more than 1000 people joined the Brigade.
As Belarusian Armed Forces continue exercises near Ukrainian border, on 8 June 2022 units of brigade held exercisers on how to capture a convoy and how to defend against enemy ambush.

Structure 
As of 2022 the brigade's structure is as follows:
 Headquarters
 56th Territorial Defense Battalion (Rivne) А7065
 57th Territorial Defense Battalion (Dubno) А7069
 58th Territorial Defense Battalion (Zdolbuniv) А7070
 59th Territorial Defense Battalion (Kostopil) А7071
 60th Territorial Defense Battalion (Sarny) А7072
 61st Territorial Defense Battalion (Volodymyrets) А7073
 Counter-Sabotage Company
 Engineering Company
 Communication Company
 Logistics Company
 Mortar Battery

Commanders 
Tsys Oleksandr 2018 - current

See also 
 Territorial Defense Forces of the Armed Forces of Ukraine

References 

Territorial defense Brigades of Ukraine
2018 establishments in Ukraine
Military units and formations established in 2018